Mark Korven is a Canadian musician and composer for film and television. His work includes the music on the sci-fi horror cult film Cube (1997), collaborations with director Robert Eggers on the period horror films The Witch (2015) and The Lighthouse (2019), and Scott Derrickson's The Black Phone (2022).

Life and career
During his early career in Winnipeg, Korven performed in a variety of rock and jazz music ensembles, mostly playing the guitar and singing in local bars. In 1977, he started taking formal music education at the Grant MacEwan Community College in Edmonton where he studied jazz and orchestration. After graduating, he developed into a singer / songwriter and recorded his first album of left-of-center pop entitled "Passengers". In 1987 he moved to Toronto, where he recorded the album "Ordinary Man" with Duke Street Records, and that same year he had his first chance at composing for film, with the score for Patricia Rozema's debut feature I've Heard the Mermaids Singing. which went on to win the La Prix de la Jeunesse at the Cannes Film Festival.

In 1992 he released one more album "This Must Be The Place", although by that time his main activity had become composing scores for film and TV works.

Korven plays several exotic instruments, including the Sarangi, the Nyckelharpa, the Duduk, the Erhu, and the water phone. He was also responsible for the creation of "The Apprehension Engine", a custom made musical instrument intended for the creation of unsettling noises to be used on scoring horror films, built by guitar luthier Tony Duggan-Smith.

Works

Film
 1987 – I've Heard the Mermaids Singing
 1990 – White Room
 1991 – Sam & Me
 1992 – The Grocer's Wife
 1992 – Voices from the Shadows
 1994 – Henry & Verlin
 1994 – The Michelle Apartments
 1995 – Curtis's Charm
 1996 – Lyddie (TV)
 1996 – Joe's Wedding
 1996 – Giant Mine
 1997 – Cube
 1999 – Win, Again! (TV)
 1999 – The Sheldon Kennedy Story (TV)
 2000 – Falling Through
 2000 – Saint Jude
 2001 – Tagged: The Jonathan Wamback Story (TV)
 2014 – Cruel and Unusual
 2015 – The Witch
 2017 – Awakening the Zodiac
 2018 – Our House
 2019 – The Lighthouse
 2021 - No One Gets Out Alive
 2021 - Resident Evil: Welcome to Raccoon City
 2022 - The Black Phone

Television
 1988 – The Twilight Zone
 1991 – Grand Larceny
 1993–1994 – Destiny Ridge
 1997 – Michael Grey Eyes
 1997 – The New Ice Age
 1997–1999 – A Scattering of Seeds
 1999–2003 – The Nature of Things
 Love Is Not Enough
 2002 – New Year's Resolutions
 2002 – Friday the 13th: The Devil in Dover
 2003 – The Ex-Factor
 2003 – Talk Mogadishu: Media Under Fire
 2003 – Hollywood Wives: The New Generation 
 2004 – Winning
 2005 – The Dark Years
 2007 – America at a Crossroads
 2008–2010 – The Border
 2019 – The Terror: Infamy
 2020–2021 – Them: Covenant 2020–2021 – Chapelwaite 2022 — The PeripheralDocumentaries
 1990 – Transplant, the Breath of Life 1990 – Between Two Worlds 1994 – Lawn and Order 1994 – The Lucky Ones: Allied Airmen in Buchenwald 1996 – Power 1997 – Confessions of a Rabid Dog 1998 – The Man Who Might Have Been: An Inquiry into the Life and Death of Herbert Norman 2001 – A Moment in Time: The United Colours of Bronstein 2003 – Arctic Dreamer 2004 – Shake Hands with the Devil: The Journey of Roméo Dallaire 2005 – Hogtown: The Politics of Policing 2005 – The Ungrateful Dead: In Search of International Justice 2006 – The Man Who Couldn't Sleep 2007 – Triage: Dr. James Orbinski's Humanitarian Dilemma 2005 – Nugliak 2007 – A Promise to the Dead: The Exile Journey of Ariel Dorfman 2007 – Turning Pages: The Life and Literature of Margaret Atwood 2008 – Tiger Spirit 2009 – The Experimental Eskimos 2009 – Pushing the Line: Art Without Reservations 2011 – Earth from Space 2013 – Fight like Soldiers, Die like Children 2016 – All Governments Lie: Truth, Deception and the Spirit of I. F. Stone''

Awards and nominations

During his career, Korven has received several awards, many at the Gemini Awards, Genie Awards and the Hot Docs Canadian International Documentary Festival.

List of Awards:

Gemini Awards
 2008 – Won – Best Original Music Score for a Documentary Program or Series: "A Promise to the Dead: The Exile Journey of Ariel Dorfman"
 2008 – Nominated – Best Original Music Score for a Program or Series: The Border For episode "Enemy Contact"
 2005 – Nominated – Best Original Music Score for a Documentary Program or Series: "Continuous Journey", award shared with:
Philip Strong, Kiran Ahluwalia, Ben Grossman, Ravi Naimpally 
 2000 – Nominated – Best Original Music Score for a Program or Mini-Series: "The Sheldon Kennedy Story"
 1999 – Nominated – Best Original Music Score for a Program or Mini-Series: "Win, Again!"
 1992 – Nominated – Best Original Music Score for a Program or Mini-Series: "Between Two Worlds"

Genie Awards
 1999 – Nominated – Best Music Score: "Cube"
 1996 – Nominated – Best Achievement in Music – Original Score: "The Michelle Apts." 
 1996 – Won – Best Achievement in Music – Original Score: "Curtis's Charm"
 1994 – Nominated – Best Music Score: "Henry & Verlin" 
 1993 – Nominated – Best Music Score: "The Grocer's Wife" 
 1991 – Nominated – Best Music Score: "White Room"

Yorkton Short Film & Video Festival
 2005 – Won Golden Sheaf Award –  Best Original Music, Non-Fiction: "Continuous Journey", award shared with: Philip Strong, Kiran Ahluwalia, Ben Grossman, Ravi Naimpally

References

External links
 Official homepage
 
 The Apprehension Engine

Year of birth missing (living people)
Living people
Musicians from Winnipeg
Canadian film score composers
Male film score composers
Canadian television composers
Best Original Score Genie and Canadian Screen Award winners
Canadian Screen Award winners
MacEwan University alumni